The Treaty of Fort McIntosh was a treaty between the United States government and representatives of the Wyandotte, Delaware, Chippewa and Ottawa nations of Native Americans. The treaty was signed at Fort McIntosh (present Beaver, Pennsylvania) on January 21, 1785. It contained 10 articles and an addendum.

In a follow up to the Treaty of Fort Stanwix (1784), where the Seneca nation had given up claims in the eastern extension of Ohio Country in northern Pennsylvania, the American government sought a treaty with the remaining tribes having claims in the Ohio Country. The United States sent a team of diplomats including George Rogers Clark, Richard Butler, and Arthur Lee to negotiate a new treaty. In January 1785, the representatives of the two sides met at Fort McIntosh at the confluence of the Ohio and Beaver Rivers. Most of the Native Americans who signed the treaty were not given authority by their nations to make negotiations. 

Connecticut (Western Reserve in the northeast) and Virginia (Military District in the central south) had residual claims in Ohio Country and would have to be distinguished from Indian Country.  Among the only known incursions of the Whiteman in Ohio Country were the U.S. revolutionary fort Fort Laurens in the east, and the old British trading post, Fort Pickawillany in the west.

Essentially, the treaty carved a large Indian reservation out of Ohio Country, whose boundaries were the Cuyahoga and Muskingum rivers in the east, a line between Fort Laurens and Fort Pickawillany (Piqua) in the south, the Great Miami River and St. Mary's River in the west, and Maumee River and Lake Erie in the north.  The area comprised about 1/3 of modern day Ohio in the northwest, and a wedge of eastern Indiana extending to Kekionga (future Fort Wayne). Areas outside the boundary in eastern and southern Ohio belonged to the Whiteman. The tribes also ceded areas surrounding Fort Detroit and Fort Michilimackinac to the United States and gave back captives taken in raids along the frontier. 

Most Ohio Country tribes did not subscribe to the treaty, particularly the Shawnee who lost all of their lands in southwestern Ohio. The treaty ceded the formation of the Western Confederacy later the same year.  Settlers as well as Indians encroaching on the boundary line presaged the Northwest Indian War.  An almost identical Treaty line, except the extension in Indiana, was later circumscribed in the Treaty of Greenville following the conclusion of the war.

See also
List of Indian treaties
Treaty of Fort Harmar, a reiteration of the terms
Firelands, a disputed region of the Connecticut Western Reserve west of the Treaty Line
Treaty of Fort Industry that acquired the Firelands region and ended the conflict there

References

Laurence M. Hauptman, Conspiracy of Interests: Iroquois Dispossession and the Rise of New York State (2001).

External links
 Text of the Treaty

History of Pennsylvania
Northwest Indian War
Ohio in the American Revolution
McIntosh, Treaty of Fort
Fort McIntosh
Aboriginal title in New York
1785 in Pennsylvania
Fort McIntosh